William Lloyd was an Irish Anglican priest in the last quarter of the seventeenth century and the first quarter of the eighteenth.

He was Dean of Achonry from 1683 to 1691 and Bishop of Killala and Achonry from then until his death on 11 December 1716.

References

  

1716 deaths
17th-century Anglican bishops in Ireland
18th-century Anglican bishops in Ireland
Bishops of Killala and Achonry
Deans of Achonry
Year of birth unknown